The 2004–05 Regionalliga season was the eleventh season of the Regionalliga at tier three of the German football league system. It was contested in two geographical divisions with eighteen teams in the south and nineteen in the north. The champions, Eintracht Braunschweig and Kickers Offenbach, and the runners-up, SC Paderborn 07 and Sportfreunde Siegen, of every division were promoted to the 2. Bundesliga.

Team movements

Promoted to 2. Bundesliga

From Nord
Rot-Weiss Essen     
1. FC Dynamo Dresden

From Süd
Rot-Weiß Erfurt
1. FC Saarbrücken1

11. FC Saarbrücken were promoted due to FC Bayern Munich II being a reserve side which are barred from promotion to the 2. Bundesliga.

Teams Relegated from 2. Bundesliga

To Nord
VfB Lübeck
1. FC Union Berlin
VfL Osnabrück

To Süd
Jahn Regensburg

Teams relegated to Oberliga

From Nord
SG Wattenscheid 09    
FC Schalke 04 II 
Sachsen Leipzig
VfR Neumünster

From Süd
1. FC Schweinfurt 05
1. FC Eschborn
1. FC Kaiserslautern II

Teams Promoted from Oberliga

To Nord
Arminia Bielefeld II(Oberliga Westfalen Champions)
Hertha BSC II(Oberliga NOFV-Nord Champions)
VfL Wolfsburg II(Oberliga Niedersachsen/Bremen Champions)

To Süd
SV Darmstadt 98(Hessenliga Champions)
FC Nöttingen(Oberliga Baden-Württemberg Champions)
TSV 1860 Munich II(Bayernliga Champions)
TuS Koblenz(Oberliga Südwest Champions)

Regionalligas

Regionalliga Nord

Table

Top scorers

Source=Weltfussball.de

Regionalliga Süd

Table

Top scorers

Source=Weltfussball.de

References

External links
 Regionalliga at the German Football Association 
 Regionalliga Nord 2004–05 at kicker.de
 Regionalliga Süd 2004–05 at kicker.de

Regionalliga seasons
3
Germ